Juan Carlo Calupitan Triviño (born in Sta. Rosa, Laguna on April 13, 1993) is a Filipino actor, comedian, model, host, podcaster and vlogger. He is best known for portraying the role of Padre Salvi in Maria Clara at Ibarra.

Career
Triviño made his acting debut when he auditioned for the youth-oriented TV show of GMA Network called Teen Gen, which is believed to be the sequel of the highly acclaimed youth oriented drama T.G.I.S., which stars Angelu de Leon and Bobby Andrews. He later got the role of Lucho, the son of Bobby Andrews' character, the former lead character of T.G.I.S., and was paired with Dianne Hernandez, who is also a newcomer.

Triviño received his first acting award nomination for his role as Padre Salvi in Maria Clara at Ibarra at the 3rd Annual TAG Awards Chicago.

Personal life
Triviño and actress Joyce Pring are in a relationship since May 2019. They became engaged that August, and married in Pasay City in February 2020. Pring gave birth to their son, Alonso Eliam, on July 2, 2021. Their second child was announced in November 2022.

On November 5, 2022, Triviño graduated with a degree in entrepreneurship at De La Salle University after taking a break from his college journey in 2009.

Filmography

Accolades and Recognitions 

 2022: 3rd Annual TAG Awards Chicago - Best Supporting Actor - Maria Clara at Ibarra 
 2023: 7th GEMS Awards 2023 - Best Performance by an Actor in a Supporting Role (TV Series) -Maria Clara at Ibarra

References

External links
 
 
 Sparkle profile

1993 births
Living people
People from Santa Rosa, Laguna
Male actors from Laguna (province)

21st-century Filipino male actors
Filipino male television actors
Filipino male comedians
Filipino podcasters
GMA Network personalities
GMA Integrated News and Public Affairs people